Lopare is a town and municipality located in Republika Srpska, an entity of Bosnia and Herzegovina. It is situated in the Majevica region. As of 2013, the town has a population of 2,709 inhabitants, while the municipality has 15,357 inhabitants.

Geography
The present Lopare municipality stretches over the area of 299 square kilometers, bordering municipalities of Ugljevik and Bijeljina in Republika Srpska, Teočak, Sapna, Tuzla and Čelić in the FBiH, as well as Brčko District.

The municipality is located where Mount Majevica transitions into the plains of Semberija and Posavina, and represents the centre of this part of sub-Majevica area. The entire area is characterized by a large number of smaller water flows, while the Gnjica River flows through the town of Lopare. The town of Lopare is located at an average altitude of 235 m above the sea level. Natural resources the municipality disposes witch include agricultural land, forests and stone, while there is also rock salt and coal, to a lesser and unexamined extent.

Demographics
According to the 2013 census results, the municipality of Lopare has a population of 15,357 inhabitants. It is important to emphasize that the municipal territory was reduced by around 30% during the war, as well as that almost one third of the pre-war population now lives in the neighboring municipality of Čelić. During and after the war, significant changes occurred in the demographic structure of the municipality.

Population

Ethnic composition

Economy
The following table gives a preview of total number of registered people employed in legal entities per their core activity (as of 2018):

Infrastructure
The regional road Tuzla–Brcko and Bijeljina–Tuzla motorway run through the municipality. The length of categorized road network is 204 km2 on the municipal territory, and there are 333 km of
uncategorized roads. While the road network is fairly developed, the number of both categorized and uncategorized paved roads is very small.

Notable people
Goran Miljanović, football player
Cvijetin Mijatović, politician, Chairman of the Collective Presidency of Yugoslavia

See also
Municipalities of Republika Srpska

References

External links 

 Official Website
 Lopare Online

Populated places in Lopare
Cities and towns in Republika Srpska
Lopare